Laulala is a Samoan surname that may refer to the following Samoan-born New Zealand rugby union player brothers:

 Casey Laulala (born 1982)
 Luteru Laulala (born 1995)
 Nepo Laulala (born 1991)

Samoan-language surnames